Turtle Creek (also known as Turtle Run) is a tributary of the Susquehanna River in Luzerne County, Pennsylvania, in the United States. Wisconsinan Bouldery Till, Wisconsinan Ice-Contact Stratified Drift, Wisconsinan Outwash, alluvium, alluvial terrace, fill, and coal dumps all occur in the vicinity of the creek. The creek has been the subject of a flood protection project. Its watershed is designated as a Coldwater Fishery and a Migratory Fishery.

Course
Turtle Creek begins in a valley near Lee Road in Conyngham Township. It flows west-southwest for approximately a mile and a half (2.5 kilometers) alongside Lee Road before passing through a pond or small lake and enters Mocanaqua. In Mocanaqua, the creek continues flowing west-southwest for a few tenths of a mile before turning northwest. After a few tenths of a mile, it turns west-southwest again and after a few tenths of a mile, reaches its confluence with the Susquehanna River.

Turtle Creek joins the Susquehanna River  upriver of its mouth.

Hydrology
Turtle creek is a perennial stream.

Geography and geology

The surficial geology in the vicinity of the upper reaches of Turtle Creek mostly features bedrock consisting of sandstone and shale. However, some patches of Wisconsinan Bouldery Till, a glacial or resedimented till containing numerous boulders, occurs in the creek's valley. Large areas of strip mining land occur to the north of its valley. In its lower reaches, the surficial geology of the creek mostly features Wisconsinan Bouldery Till and Wisconsinan Ice-Contact Stratified Drift, which contains stratified sand and gravel along with some boulders. Wisconsinan Outwash, alluvium, alluvial terrace, fill, and coal dumps (large piles of coal waste) also occur near the creek's mouth.

The valley of Turtle Creek is a deep and narrow strike valley. During the late Wisconsinan glaciation, basal ice flowed along the valley. Penobscot Mountain is located to the south of the creek.

In 1997, Conyngham Township received a permit to replace the bridge with another structure. The proposed structure contained a 10.9-foot by 4.25-foot aluminum box culvert.

Watershed
The mouth of the creek is in the United States Geological Survey quadrangle of Shickshinny. However, the source is in the quadrangle of Nanticoke. The drainage basin is part of the Lower North Branch Susquehanna drainage basin.

History
Turtle Creek was entered into the Geographic Names Information System on August 2, 1979. Its identifier in the Geographic Names Information System 1189974. Turtle Creek, is also known as Turtle Run. This name appears on Patton's Philadelphia and Suburbs Street and Road Map of 1984.

The Pennsylvania Department of Environmental Protection has completed a flood protection project on Turtle Creek. Such a project was considered as early as 1957.

Biology
The entire drainage basin of Turtle Creek is designated as a Coldwater Fishery and a Migratory Fishery.

See also
Rocky Run (Susquehanna River), next tributary of the Susquehanna River going downriver
Black Creek (Susquehanna River), next tributary of the Susquehanna River going upriver
List of rivers of Pennsylvania

References

Rivers of Luzerne County, Pennsylvania
Tributaries of the Susquehanna River
Rivers of Pennsylvania